Richard Lovelace may refer to:

 Richard Lovelace (poet) (1617–1657), 17th century English poet
 Richard Lovelace, 1st Baron Lovelace (1564–1634)
 Richard V. E. Lovelace (fl. 1960s–2010s), American astrophysicist